Udochukwu Nwoko (born 15 October 1984) is a retired professional footballer who last played for Cypriot Third Division side MEAP Nisou as a midfielder. Born in Nigeria, he represented the Malta national team.

Playing career
Born in Abia, Nigeria, Nwoko moved to Malta at the age of 14 in the hope that it could one day lead him to one of the top leagues in Europe.  He started his career at Hibernians.  His main break came during the 2002–03 season, where he made 16 appearances for the club, but failed to find the net.

He then moved to Xewkija Tigers of the Gozo Football League in 2004, and transformed into a predator in front of goal. Nwoko hit 18 goals in just 25 appearances, and became one of the hottest prospects in Maltese football.

Following the successful spell with Xewkija Tigers, Nwoko found himself back in the Maltese Premier League joining Mosta for the 2005–06 season.  He made 27 appearances and scored 10 goals for the club, but it wasn't enough to save the club, and they were relegated by the difference of a point.

Despite the relegation, Nwoko's form hadn't gone unnoticed and was re-signed by his first club Hibernians for the 2006–07 season, getting another chance to play in the Maltese Premier League.  He made 17 appearances with the club and scored 5 goal.

He then moved on loan to fellow Maltese Premier League side Marsaxlokk for the remainder of 2007.  He made 18 appearances, and score 3 goals; he did however finish the season as a part of the 2006–07 championship-winning squad and won his first ever Maltese Premier League.

In 2007, he moved to Portuguese club Leixões, where he marked his debut with a goal against giants Benfica. He was linked to a £1.25m transfer to the Premiership club Reading in January 2008, but an unfortunate injury at the short transfer window stopped the transfer.  . Nwoko recently terminated his contract with Portuguese club Leixoes. He signed a short contract with a Brazilian top league club, on 21 March 2009 Clube Náutico Capibaribe in Brazil. In summer 2009, he signed for Panthrakikos F.C. in the Greek Super League, and left at the end of the season when the club was relegated. In January 2010, he signed for Doxa Katokopia in the Cypriot First Division, staying there for just 6 months before in June 2010, he signed for Pas Hamedan in the Iran Pro League.

He signed for Floriana in January 2013. On 27 June 2014 he signed with Gudja United.
After one season with Gudja he signed a one-year contract with St. George's on 15 July 2015.

On 17 March 2017 Udo signed with MFK Topvar Topoľčany from the 3. Liga in Slovakia. He won 8 caps and scored 1 goal.

International career
Nwoko was called up by Malta for the first time ahead of a UEFA Euro 2008 qualifying matches against Hungary in Budapest on 13 October 2007 and also played at home to Moldova four days later.  He was available for selection after being granted Maltese citizenship in August 2007.

Honours
Maltese Premier League (1):
2006–07

References

External links

Udo Nwoko profile at MaltaFootball.com
Udo Nwoko profile at leixoessc.pt

1984 births
Living people
People with acquired Maltese citizenship
Maltese footballers
Malta international footballers
Maltese expatriate footballers
Hibernians F.C. players
Mosta F.C. players
Marsaxlokk F.C. players
Floriana F.C. players
Leixões S.C. players
Pas players
Clube Náutico Capibaribe players
Panthrakikos F.C. players
Doxa Katokopias FC players
Nigerian expatriate sportspeople in Greece
Primeira Liga players
Super League Greece players
Nigerian expatriate sportspeople in Brazil
Expatriate footballers in Portugal
Expatriate footballers in Cyprus
Expatriate footballers in Scotland
Expatriate footballers in Greece
Expatriate footballers in Iran
Expatriate footballers in Wales
Nigerian expatriate sportspeople in Portugal
Nigerian expatriate sportspeople in Cyprus
Nigerian expatriate sportspeople in Scotland
Nigerian expatriate sportspeople in Iran
Nigerian expatriate sportspeople in Wales
Maltese expatriate sportspeople in Portugal
Maltese expatriate sportspeople in Cyprus
Maltese expatriate sportspeople in Scotland
Maltese expatriate sportspeople in Greece
Maltese expatriate sportspeople in Iran
Maltese expatriate sportspeople in Wales
Maltese expatriate sportspeople in Brazil
Nigerian footballers
Neath F.C. players
Cymru Premier players
Cypriot First Division players
MEAP Nisou players
Xewkija Tigers F.C. players
Association football midfielders
Gudja United F.C. players
Nigerian emigrants to Malta